The following is a timeline of the history of the city of Spokane, Washington, USA.

19th Century
 1874 - Spokane Falls settlement established in Washington Territory by James N. Glover.
 1879 - Spokane Times newspaper begins publication.
 1880 - Population: 350.
 1881 - November 29: Spokane Falls incorporated as a town and then as a City.
 1882 - Spokane becomes seat of Spokane County.
 1883
 Northern Pacific Railway begins operating.
 Central School opens.
 1884 - YMCA established.
 1887
 Sacred Heart Hospital opens.
 Jesuit Gonzaga College established.
 1889
 August 4–6: The Great Fire.
 Union Pacific Railroad begins operating.
 Town becomes part of the new U.S. State of Washington.
 1890
 Town of Spokane Falls renamed "Spokane."
 Casino Opera House opens (approximate date).
 Population: 19,922.
 1891
  Spokane High School and Holy Names Academy built.
 Amtrak inter-city rail station opened.
 1892 - Great Northern Railway built.
 1893 - September 19: Franz Ferdinand of Austria visits town incognito.
 1894 - The Spokesman-Review newspaper in publication.
 1895
 Spokane County Courthouse built.
 U.S. military Fort George Wright established near town.
 1896 - Deaconess Hospital established.
 1897 - Chamber of Commerce and Spokane Stock Exchange established.
 1900 - Population: 36,848.

20th century
 1904
 Spokane and Inland Empire Railroad began operations (until 1929).
 Manito Park and Botanical Gardens created.
 1905
 Spokane Public Library building opens.
 Woman's Club formed.
 1908 - Portland-Spokane railway begins operating.
 1909 - Federal building constructed.
 1910
 Commission form of government adopted.
 Population: 104,402.
 1914
 Whitworth College active.
 Davenport Hotel in business.
 Clemmer Theater built.
 1915 - Spokane Mountaineers club formed.
 1916
 Eastern Washington State Historical Society established.
 Northwest Museum of Arts and Culture established as the Cheney Cowles Museum.
 1919 - National Association for the Advancement of Colored People chapter founded.
 1921 - Civic building opens.
 1925 - October: National Indian Congress held.
 1929
 Spokane Daily Times begins publication.
 Cambern Dutch Shop Windmill built.
 1931 - Fox Theater an Art Deco movie theater
 1932 - Park Inn opens.
 1933 - Grand Coulee Dam construction begins in vicinity of Spokane.
 1935 - Benewah Milk Bottle building constructed.
 1938 - Spokane Art Center opens.
 1939 - Doyle's Ice Cream Parlor opens.
 1942 - U.S. military Fairchild Air Force Base begins operating near Spokane.
 1946
 Spokane municipal airport active.
 Yoke's Fresh Market in business.
 1947 - Spokane Civic Theatre incorporated.
 1954
 Spokane Coliseum opens.
 Cathedral of St. John the Evangelist built.
 1955 - NorthTown Mall in business.
 1960
 Mayor-council-manager form of government adopted.
 Population: 181,608.
 1963
 Spokane Community College established.
 Protest during the Civil Rights Movement
 1967 - Spokane Falls Community College opens.
 1974
 Spokane Convention Center built.
 Pavilion Opera House and River Park Square shopping center open.
 Expo '74 world's fair held in Spokane.
 1977 - Lilac Bloomsday Run begins.
 1978
 Spokane Fire Station Museum established.
 Riverfront Park established.
 1981
 Spokane River Centennial Trail constructed.
 Spokane Historic Landmarks Commission created.
 1990 - Spokane Hoopfest begins.
 1995
 Community Health Association of Spokane active.
 Spokane Arena opens.
 1996 - City website online (approximate date).
 1997
 Spokane Preservation Advocates organized.
 Spokane Valley Mall in business near city.
 1999 - Spokane Washington Temple opens.

21st century
 2003
 September 23: Gun incident at high school.
 James E. West becomes the 43rd mayor.
 2005
 Cathy McMorris Rodgers becomes U.S. representative for Washington's 5th congressional district.
 Spokane Valley Heritage Museum established.
 2007 - Spokane hosts U.S. Figure Skating Championships
 2010
Population: 208,916.
 Spokane hosts U.S. Figure Skating Championships
 2011 - January: Bombing attempt.
 2012 - David Condon becomes the 46th mayor of Spokane.
 2020  
 Population: 228,989. 
Nadine Woodward becomes the 47th Mayor of Spokane. 
Construction began on the Spokane Sportsplex owned by the Spokane Public Facilities District.  
Construction began on the City Line.

See also
 History of Spokane, Washington
 National Register of Historic Places listings in Spokane
 Timeline of Washington (state) history

other cities in Washington
 Timeline of Seattle
 Timeline of the Tri-Cities, Washington

References

Bibliography

External links

 Items related to Spokane, various dates (via Digital Public Library of America).

 
Spokane
Spokane
Years in Washington (state)